TCCA may refer to:

 Color Association of the United States, formerly known as Textile Color Card Association
 Transport Canada's Civil Aviation
 Toronto City Centre Airport (Billy Bishop Toronto City Airport)
 Trichloroisocyanuric acid